Nawabzada Mazher Ali Khan (born 1 November 1945) is a Pakistani politician who had been a member of the National Assembly of Pakistan, from June 2013 to May 2018.

Early life
He was born on 1 November 1945. He is brother of Nawabzada Gazanfar Ali Gul.

Political career

He was elected to the National Assembly of Pakistan as a candidate of Pakistan Muslim League (N) (PML-N) from Constituency NA-104 (Gujrat-I) in 2013 Pakistani general election. He received 85,113 votes and defeated Chaudhry Wajahat Hussain.

References

Living people
Pakistan Muslim League (N) politicians
Punjabi people
Pakistani MNAs 2013–2018
1945 births